Overhanging Cliff is a cliff of vertical basalt that overhangs the Grand Loop Road just north of Tower Fall on the north rim of the Grand Canyon of the Yellowstone in Yellowstone National Park. The point was most likely named by a member of the Cook–Folsom–Peterson Expedition, David Folsum in 1869. It is the only place in the US in which the Contour lines cross

Notes

Landforms of Yellowstone National Park
Landforms of Park County, Wyoming
Tourist attractions in Park County, Wyoming
Cliffs of the United States